Hopewell is an unincorporated community in Laurel County, Kentucky, United States. It lies at an elevation of 1260 feet (384 m).

References

Unincorporated communities in Laurel County, Kentucky
Unincorporated communities in Kentucky